Events from the year 1580 in France

Incumbents
 Monarch – Henry III

Events
 March 1 – Michel de Montaigne signs the preface to his most significant work, Essays. They are published later the same year.

Births

 April 24 – Vincent de Paul, French priest and saint (d. 1660)
 September 15 – Charles Annibal Fabrot, French lawyer (d. 1659)
 December 1 – Nicolas-Claude Fabri de Peiresc, French astronomer (d. 1637)
 date unknown
 Pierre Vernier, French mathematician and instrument inventor (d. 1637)
 Benjamin, Duke of Soubise, French Huguenot leader (d. 1642)

Deaths
 Renée de Dinteville
Anne de Pisseleu d'Heilly

See also

References

1580s in France